Engoniophos is a genus of sea snails, marine gastropod mollusks in the subfamily of the family Nassariidae.

Taxonomy 
This genus was treated within family Buccinidae. It was moved to family Nassariidae in 2016.

Species
Species within the genus Engoniophos include:
 † Engoniophos erectus (Guppy, 1873)
 Engoniophos unicinctus (Say, 1826)

References

 Landau B., Silva C.M. da & Heitz A. (2016). Systematics of the gastropods of the Lower–Middle Miocene Cantaure Formation, Paraguaná Formation, Paraguaná peninsula, Venezuela. Bulletins of American Paleontology. 389-390: 1-581

External links
  Galindo, L. A.; Puillandre, N.; Utge, J.; Lozouet, P.; Bouchet, P. (2016). The phylogeny and systematics of the Nassariidae revisited (Gastropoda, Buccinoidea). Molecular Phylogenetics and Evolution. 99: 337-353

Nassariidae